Stephan Bassily Bey (1900-1990) (اسطفان باسيلى بك) born 1900 Member of the Egyptian Parliament in the forties and a member of the Wafd Party's supreme authority, he was an eminent  lawyer and vice chairman of the Egyptian Bar Association for many years until  1986, also was a member of the International Bar Association  and a founding member of the Union of Arab Lawyers, he died  July 1990.

After his graduation from law school 1925, trained for four years at his uncle office Morcos Pasha Fahmy the great lawyer of his era, open his own law practice office  at the same building (Insurance Building Mustafa Kamel Square ) Qasr el-Nil Street heart of Cairo. And devoted his life to serve law and Justice.
1942 Elected an executive member of Bar association council .
1949 Elected Vic Chairman of Egyptian Bar Association for several consecutive years until and  decide to not to enter election for bar association 1986.
1949 Founder member of the Union of Arab Lawyers till 1990
1949 Elected member of Parliament, and attended several international parliamentary conferences until 1986 when he give up his parliamentary services.
1950 bestowed Bakawai (البكاوية)(bestowed the title of bey) from King Farouk for his efforts and his good character.
 1976 Co-opt to General Congregation Council of the Coptic Orthodox church and re elected convectively till year 1990.
1978 Appointed by President Anwar Sadat to the board of directors of the Coptic orthodox Endowments .
Elected President of Cairo  Rotary Club 1970/1971 member since 1945
Member of Heliopolis Sporting Club since April 1949

1900 births
1990 deaths
19th-century Egyptian people
Egyptian pashas
World War II political leaders
Wafd Party politicians
Members of the Parliament of Egypt